Thomas the Rhymer is a fantasy novel by American writer Ellen Kushner.  It is based on the ballad of Thomas the Rhymer, a piece of folklore in which Thomas Learmonth's love of the Queen of Elfland was rewarded with the gift of prophecy.  The novel won the 1991 World Fantasy Award and Mythopoeic Award.

Plot summary
Thomas, a harper from court, befriends a humble farmer and his wife.  As he begins a relationship with Elspeth, their neighbor, he is whisked to Elfland, ensnared by the Fairy Queen.  After seven years he returns to Gavin, Meg, and Elspeth with a parting gift from the Queen: he can only speak the truth.

Characters

Thomas
A minstrel who sang in the king's court.  Before he is captured by the Fairy Queen, he is a carefree young man.

Elspeth
A young woman who falls in love with Thomas.  In the seven years of his absence, her hard life makes her cynical.

Gavin
A rather simple crofter who takes Thomas in.

The Queen of Elfland
Although powerful and beautiful, the Fairy Queen can be unmerciful.  While she does release Thomas after seven years as her lover, she never truly lets him go.

Meg
Gavin's wife who sees value in Thomas and believes him when others do not.

Awards
 1991 World Fantasy Award
 1991 Mythopoeic Award
 2009 Tähtifantasia Award for the best foreign fantasy novel released in Finland in 2008.

References

External links
 Ellen Kushner's Thomas the Rhymer

1991 American novels
American fantasy novels
World Fantasy Award for Best Novel-winning works